Falling Cat is an 1894 short film produced and directed by Étienne-Jules Marey, a French scientist. It was the third film that came out in the 19th century filmed in a public park, Bois de Boulogne, and released in France. It is believed to be the first motion picture in history to show a live cat.  The film consists solely of the feline falling down and landing on its feet.

Marey had assembled a camera that was capable of taking twelve consecutive frames a second. It resembled a short barrelled shotgun with a magazine. With this, he studied various animals in action.  His most famous study was his ‘animated zoo’, in which this cat was dropped from a height of a few feet in order to see if it always landed on its feet.

See also 
 Falling cat problem

References

External links 
 
 Falling Cat at YouTube

1894 films
French silent short films
1894 short films
French black-and-white films
Films about cats
1890s French films